Cosmo Oil Yokkaichi F.C. was a Japanese football club based in Mie. The club has played in Japan Soccer League Division 2 and in the former Japan Football League.

Club name
?–1983: Daikyo Oil SC
1984–1986: Cosmo Daikyo SC
1986–1995: Cosmo Oil SC
1996: Cosmo Oil Yokkaichi FC

See also
Veertien Mie, successor representative (and sponsored by Cosmo Oil)

External links
Football of Japan

Japan Soccer League clubs
Sports teams in Mie Prefecture
Defunct football clubs in Japan
Japan Football League (1992–1998) clubs
1996 disestablishments in Japan
Association football clubs disestablished in 1996
Works association football clubs in Japan